Ophichthus pullus is an eel in the family Ophichthidae (worm/snake eels). It was co-discovered by John E. McCosker and Ian Moore in 2005. It is a marine, tropical eel which is known from Angola and Guinea-Bissau, in the eastern Atlantic Ocean.

The species epithet "pullus" means "dark coloured" in Latin, and refers to the eel's colouring.

References

Taxa named by John E. McCosker
Fish described in 2005
phullus